Qaba Kolaki (also Romanized as Qabā Kolakī) is a village in Baghak Rural District, in the Central District of Tangestan County, Bushehr Province, Iran. At the 2006 census, its population was 1,046, in 263 families.

References 

Populated places in Tangestan County